The Dagum distribution (or Mielke Beta-Kappa distribution) is a continuous probability distribution defined over positive real numbers. It is named after Camilo Dagum, who proposed it in a series of papers in the 1970s.  The Dagum distribution arose from several variants of a new model on the size distribution of personal income and is mostly associated with the study of income distribution.  There is both a three-parameter specification (Type I) and a four-parameter specification (Type II) of the Dagum distribution; a summary of the genesis of this distribution can be found in "A Guide to the Dagum Distributions".  A general source on statistical size distributions often cited in work using the Dagum distribution is Statistical Size Distributions in Economics and Actuarial Sciences.

Definition
The cumulative distribution function of the Dagum distribution (Type I) is given by

The corresponding probability density function is given by

The quantile function is given by

The Dagum distribution can be derived as a special case of the generalized Beta II (GB2) distribution (a generalization of the Beta prime distribution):

There is also an intimate relationship between the Dagum and  Singh–Maddala / Burr distribution.

The cumulative distribution function of the Dagum (Type II) distribution adds a point mass at the origin and then follows a Dagum (Type I) distribution over the rest of the support (i.e. over the positive halfline)

Use in economics
The Dagum distribution is often used to model income and wealth distribution. The relation between the Dagum Type I and the gini coefficient is summarized in the formula below:

where  is the gamma function. Note that this value is independent from the scale-parameter, .

Although the Dagum distribution is not the only three parameter distribution used to model income distribution it is usually the most appropriate.

References

External links
Camilo Dagum (1925 - 2005) : obituary

Continuous distributions
Income inequality metrics
Economic inequality